Jill Masefield  McDonald  (30 October 1927 – 2 January 1982) was a New-Zealand-born children's writer and  illustrator, working in the United Kingdom from the mid-1960s. Much of her work was done for Puffin Books, the children's imprint of Penguin, and for its club's  magazine Puffin Post.

Life
She was born in Wellington, New Zealand in 1927. Her father was Reginald Bedford Hammond, a distant cousin of John Masefield. She initially trained as an architect, but turned to illustration following her marriage, becoming art editor of the New Zealand School Journal.

In 1965 she moved to England with her two children. There she worked  for Puffin Books, the children's imprint of Penguin. Much of her work was on Puffin Post, the members' magazine of the Puffin Club,  launched in 1967, whose visual style she shaped. In addition to the cover designs, her contributions included a regular column in which Odway, a philosophical dog, invited responses from readers. In McDonald's Times obituary, Kaye Webb, the editor of Puffin Books wrote of her work:everyone who knows it has been captivated  not only by her brilliant use of colour and unique style, but the way each sure, strong line seems to impose a very individual and secret humour.

She was the author of twelve picture books for children.

She died in London on 2 January 1982.

Selected works

As writer and illustrator
 Maggy Scraggle Loves the Beautiful Ice-cream Man (1978) Harmondsworth: Kestrel Books 
 Counting on an Elephant  (1975) Harmondsworth : Kestrel Books 
 The Happyhelper Engine (1980) London: Methuen Children's Books

As illustrator
 Aitchison, Janet (1970), The Pirates' Tale Harmondsworth: Penguin (Picture Puffin) 
 Cash, Alan (1966), The Puffin Crossword Puzzle Book Harmondsworth: Penguin Books (Puffin)
 Cunliffe, John (1971), Farmer Barnes and the Goats London: Collins 
 Greaves, Margaret (1966), Your Turn Next London: Methuen Educational; (1973 edn): 
 Greaves, Margaret (1968), Gallery London: Methuen Educational
 Greaves, Margaret (ed.) (1969), Scrap-box: Poems for Grown-ups to Share with Children London: Methuen
 Greaves, Margaret (1971), The Snowman of Biddle (Gallimaufry 1) London: Methuen Educational 
 Greaves, Margaret (1971), The Rainbow Sun (Gallimaufry 2) London: Methuen 
 Greaves, Margaret (1971), King Solomon and the Hoopoes (Gallimaufry 3) London: Methuen 
 Greaves, Margaret (1971), The Great Bell of Peking (Gallimaufry 4) London: Methuen 
 Greaves, Margaret (1971), The Dagger and the Bird London: Methuen 
 Greaves, Margaret (1972), Two at Number 20 London: Methuen 
 Greaves, Margaret (1973), Little Jacko and the Wolf People London: Methuen 
 Hunter, Norman (1974), Norman Hunter's Book of Magic London: Bodley Head 
 Hunter, Norman (1976), Professor Branestawm’s Do-it-yourself Handbook London: Bodley Head ; (1979) Harmondsworth: Penguin Books (Puffin) 
 Hunter, Norman (1978), Vanishing Ladies, and Other Magic London : Bodley Head 
 Hunter, Norman, with illustrations by George Adamson, Derek Cousins, W. Heath Robinson and Jill McDonald (1980), The Best of Branestawm London: Bodley Head
 Sloan, Carolyn (1974), The Penguin and the Vacuum Cleaner. Harmondsworth: Penguin (Puffin) 
Turnbull, Michael Robert McGregor (1960), The Changing Land: A Short History of New Zealand for Children London: Longman
Waters, John F. (1972) The Royal Potwasher London: Methuen

References

External links

 

1927 births
1982 deaths
People from Wellington City
New Zealand artists
New Zealand women artists
New Zealand writers
New Zealand women writers